Thomas Ernest "Satch" Sanders (born November 8, 1938) is an American former professional basketball player and coach. He played his entire professional career as a power forward for the Boston Celtics of the National Basketball Association (NBA). Sanders won eight NBA championships and is tied for third for the most NBA championships. He is also one of three NBA players with an unsurpassed 8–0 record in NBA Finals series. After his playing retirement, he served as a head coach for the Harvard Crimson men's basketball team and the Boston Celtics. Sanders was inducted into the Naismith Basketball Hall of Fame as a contributor in 2011.

Career

After playing at New York University as a stand out collegian, he spent all of his 13 years in the National Basketball Association (NBA) with the Boston Celtics. He scored a career-high 30 points to go along with 26 rebounds in a 142-110 win over the Syracuse Nationals on March 13, 1962. He was part of the eight championship teams in 1961–66, 1968 and 1969. In NBA history, only teammates Bill Russell and Sam Jones have won more championship rings during their playing careers (three other teammates, John Havlicek, Tom Heinsohn and K. C. Jones, also won eight championship rings).

Sanders underwent knee surgery in 1970 after he injured his left knee during the last Celtics game for the regular season. This immensely affected his ability to play afterwards. He announced he was ending his playing career in 1973. On March 20, 1968, a housing development group formed by Sanders (called the Sanders Associates) received a $996,000 FHA commitment through the Boston Rehabilitation Program (BURP) for the rehabilitation of 83 units in Roxbury, Massachusetts after local community activists (including Mel King) criticized BURP for a lack of sufficient community control and racial equity.

Following his playing career Sanders became the basketball coach at Harvard University, a position he held until 1977. Sanders became the first African-American to serve as a head coach of any sport in the Ivy League. In 1978, Sanders became the head coach of the Boston Celtics, taking over for former teammate Tommy Heinsohn. Sanders returned the following season; however after a 2–12 record he was replaced by Dave Cowens, who took on the role as a player-coach. In 1986, Sanders founded the Rookie Transition Program - the first such program in any major American sport.

NBA career statistics

Regular season

Playoffs

References

External links
 BasketballReference.com: Satch Sanders (as coach) 
 BasketballReference.com: Satch Sanders (as player)
 Sports-Reference.com: Satch Sanders (as college coach)

1938 births
Living people
African-American basketball coaches
African-American basketball players
All-American college men's basketball players
American men's basketball players
Basketball coaches from New York (state)
Basketball players from New York City
Boston Celtics draft picks
Boston Celtics head coaches
Boston Celtics players
College men's basketball head coaches in the United States
Harvard Crimson men's basketball coaches
Naismith Memorial Basketball Hall of Fame inductees
National Basketball Association players with retired numbers
NYU Violets men's basketball players
Power forwards (basketball)
Seward Park High School alumni
Small forwards
21st-century African-American people
20th-century African-American sportspeople